Cécile Rilhac (born 21 April 1974) is a French politician of La République En Marche! (LREM) who has been serving as a member of the French National Assembly since 18 June 2017, representing the department of Val-d'Oise.

Political career
In parliament, Rilhac serves on the Committee on Cultural Affairs and Education. In addition to her committee assignments, she is part of the French-Algerian Parliamentary Friendship Group.

In 2020, Rilhac joined En commun (EC), a group within LREM led by Barbara Pompili.

Political positions

Domestic policy
In June 2019, Rilhac was one of four members of the LREM parliamentary group who joined a cross-party initiative to legalize the distribution and use of cannabis. Along with four other LREM members – Coralie Dubost, Jean-Michel Mis, Stéphane Trompille, and Eric Bothorel –, she disassociated herself from their colleague Aurore Bergé when the latter announced her intention in October 2019 to vote for a Republican draft law banning the wearing of the hijab by women accompanying groups of students on school outings. 

In 2020, Rilhac was one of ten LREM members who voted against her parliamentary group's majority and opposed a much discussed security bill drafted by her colleagues Alice Thourot and Jean-Michel Fauvergue that helps, among other measures, curtail the filming of police forces.

Foreign policy
In 2018, Rilhac joined other co-signatories around Sébastien Nadot in officially filing a request for a commission of inquiry into the legality of French weapons sales to the Saudi-led coalition fighting in Yemen, days before an official visit of Saudi Crown Prince Mohammed bin Salman to Paris. 

In July 2019, Rilhac voted in favor of the French ratification of the European Union’s Comprehensive Economic and Trade Agreement (CETA) with Canada.

See also
 2017 French legislative election

References

1974 births
Living people
Deputies of the 15th National Assembly of the French Fifth Republic
La République En Marche! politicians
21st-century French women politicians
Place of birth missing (living people)
Women members of the National Assembly (France)
Members of Parliament for Val-d'Oise